Bulbophyllum papuanum is a species in the family Orchidaceae.  It grows as a pseudobulb epiphyte in forests at elevations between 1600 and 1800 meters above sea level. It is native to Papua New Guinea. It was formerly known as Pedilochilus papuanus and was the type species of the genus Pedilochilus, now synonymous with Bulbophyllum.

References

External links

Internet Orchid Species Photo Encyclopedia

papuanum